Asau may refer to:

Asău, Romanian commune
Asau, Samoa, a village in Samoa
Asau, Tuvalu, a village in Tuvalu

See also 
 Asău